Brodie Henderson may refer to:
 Brodie Henderson (rugby union)
 Sir Brodie Henderson (engineer)